Khewang     is a village development committee in the Himalayas of Taplejung District in the Province No. 1 of north-eastern Nepal. At the time of the 2011 Nepal census it had a population of 2,691 people living in 526 individual households. There were 1,283 males and 1,408 females at the time of census.Now it is a part of Sirijangha Municipality.

References

External links
UN map of the municipalities of Taplejung District
Khewang Club of Khewang VDC of Taplejung District

Populated places in Taplejung District